Mihăiță Păunel Pleșan (born 19 February 1983) is a Romanian former professional footballer who played as a central midfielder.

Club career
Pleșan was born in Moldova Nouă. He started his career at Universitatea Craiova. When Craiova was relegated at the end of the 2004–05 season, he moved to Dinamo București. Subsequently, after just a few months at Dinamo, Plesan moved to Timișoara.

Pleșan signed a five-year contract with Steaua București on 6 August 2007. In 2009–10, Pleșan was demoted to the B squad. In October 2009 he returned to first team.

On 30 July 2010, Pleșan signed a contract with FC Volga Nizhny Novgorod.

International career
Pleșan scored one goal for Romania, on 28 April 2004 in a friendly match against Germany.

Career statistics
Scores and results list Romania's goal tally first, score column indicates score after each Pleșan goal.

References

External links
 
 
 
  
 

1983 births
Living people
People from Moldova Nouă
Romanian footballers
Association football midfielders
Romania international footballers
Liga I players
Liga II players
Russian Premier League players
FC Dinamo București players
FC Politehnica Timișoara players
FC Steaua București players
FC Steaua II București players
FC U Craiova 1948 players
FC Volga Nizhny Novgorod players
CS Universitatea Craiova players
Romanian expatriate footballers
Romanian expatriate sportspeople in Russia
Expatriate footballers in Russia